The committees of the 7th Supreme People's Assembly (SPA) of North Korea were elected by the 1st Session of the aforementioned body on 5 April 1982. It was replaced on 30 December 1986 by the committees of the 8th Supreme People's Assembly.

Committees

Bills

Budget

Credentials

References

Citations

Bibliography
Books:
 

7th Supreme People's Assembly
1982 establishments in North Korea
1986 disestablishments in North Korea